The occipitofrontal fasciculus, also known as the fronto-occipital fasciculus, passes backward from the frontal lobe, along the lateral border of the caudate nucleus, and on the medial aspect of the corona radiata; its fibers radiate in a fan-like manner and pass into the occipital and temporal lobes lateral to the posterior and inferior cornua.

Some sources distinguish between an inferior fronto-occipital fasciculus (IFOF) and a superior fronto-occipital fasciculus (SFOF), however the latter is no longer believed to exist in the human brain.

References

External links
 
 

  

Cerebral white matter